William Patrick Wynn (born September 10, 1961) is an American businessman and politician, who was the mayor of Austin, Texas from 2003 to 2009.

Family 
Born and raised in Beaumont, Texas, Wynn was the sixth of seven children. He attended Texas A&M University, where he graduated cum laude with a degree in Environmental Design in 1984. Although Wynn was born in East Texas, his family's roots in Austin and Central Texas run deep; two of his great-great-great grandparents, James and Julia Olive, settled in southern Williamson County in 1843.

His great-grandfather, Daniel LeMaster of McDade, was the state representative for Bastrop County in the 1920s. Will's great-uncle, Ridley Ott, built and managed the Checker Front General Store, now FreshPlus, at 43rd and Duval in Hyde Park during the 1930s and 40s.

Some of his family's history in Central Texas can be seen in several books by J. Frank Dobie, including "Cow People" and "The Longhorns"; "The Ladder of Rivers" by Harry Chrisman; "Black Cowboys of Texas" by Sara Massey, "Four on a Limb" and "I'll Die Before I'll Run" by C.L. Sonnichsen; and "The Shooters" by Leon Metz.

He first moved to Austin in 1981. Will is the father of two daughters.

Early career
Wynn has over 20 years of experience in the commercial real estate industry, with projects large and small, including the $40 million redevelopment of the Frost Bank Plaza on Congress Avenue in Downtown Austin. In 1997, Will founded CIVITAS Investments, Inc. to focus on historic restoration projects. He is a member of the Urban Land Institute and believes that only through dramatically better land use practices can Austin and the surrounding region appropriately deal with challenges like traffic, air quality, housing affordability and environmental protection. In 2001, he was one of the founding members of, what became, Envision Central Texas. Will has also worked over the years to build support for numerous local causes and organizations.

Prior to being elected to the Austin City Council in 2000, Wynn served as Chair of the Downtown Austin Alliance, in addition to acting as Director of the Children's Museum and Heritage Society of Austin. He has long been a leading advocate for transforming downtown Austin into the most vibrant urban core in the country.

Mayor of Austin
Austin voters elected Wynn to be Austin's fiftieth mayor on May 3, 2003, replacing Gus Garcia. He was re-elected three years later on May 15, 2006 with over 78 percent of the vote. The front-runner from the start, Wynn garnered most of the endorsements and raised much more money than his two competitors, Council Member Danny Thomas, and Jennifer Gale. He also received a boost from the strong leadership credited to him when Hurricane Katrina evacuees came to Austin in 2005.

As Austin Mayor, Will Wynn served as Chairman of the Board of Directors for Austin Energy, the 9th largest public power utility in the United States. As such, Mayor Wynn presided over the nation's most successful utility-sponsored green power program (for the 4th consecutive year according to the U.S. Dep't of Energy), an award-winning energy efficiency program that has eliminated the need for a 500-megawatt, coal-burning power plant near Austin, and a greenbuilding program that was the first of its kind in the world and served as the genesis for the U.S. Green Building Council (USGBC) and the national greenbuilding movement. Austin Energy has assets of over $3.5 billion, annual revenues of $1.2 billion, almost 1,500 employees and generates up to 3,000 megawatts of electricity. Its fuel mix is 35% natural gas, 29% coal, 23% nuclear and 11% renewables (mostly wind).

Wynn was succeeded as mayor by Lee Leffingwell, who was sworn in on June 22, 2009.

Awards
Will was named Austinite of the Year by Austin Under Forty (back when he was under 40); was awarded Scenic Austin's first annual Scenic Hero Award; was named Energy Executive of the Year by the Association of Energy Engineers; is a Distinguished Alumni of Texas A & M's College of Architecture; received the Alliance to Save Energy's prestigious Charles H. Percy Public Service Award; and, following Austin's response to Hurricane Katrina, was named Local Public Official of the Year by the National Association of Social Workers.

Affiliations
He is a member of the Mayors Against Illegal Guns Coalition, a bi-partisan anti-gun group with a stated goal of "making the public safer by getting illegal guns off the streets." The Coalition was co-founded by the late former Boston Mayor Thomas Menino and former New York City Mayor Michael Bloomberg.

Toll roads
Mayor Wynn voted in favor of a Capital Area Metropolitan Planning Organization (CAMPO) toll road plan on July 12, 2004, prompting the Texas People for Efficient Transportation PAC to start a movement seek a recall election of the mayor. The committee volunteers gathered over 36,000 signatures, but fell short of the 40,000 needed to failed to place the recall on the May 7, 2005 ballot

Controversies and conviction
Mayor Will Wynn apologized after he physically ejected a man who had crashed a party at Wynn's downtown condo building on March 17, 2006. The man claimed that after being told to leave by Wynn, the mayor followed him outside and proceeded to choke him.

On November 11, 2007, Wynn was also involved in an incident where he yelled at a big rig truck that was blocking morning rush hour traffic on downtown Austin's 5th Street. The Mayor apologized and said he "spewed a fog of profanity".

On March 5, 2008, Travis County prosecutors charged Wynn with a Class C misdemeanor for assault for the Luke Johnson incident. The Judge ordered Wynn to get anger management therapy

References

External links

City of Austin - Mayor Will Wynn Profile

Mayors of Austin, Texas
Texas Democrats
Texas A&M University alumni
People from Beaumont, Texas
Living people
1961 births
American people convicted of assault
Texas politicians convicted of crimes